Habibi Ke Nain is an Indian 2019 romantic Hindi song voiced by Shreya Ghoshal and Jubin Nautiyal which is penned by Irfan Kamal for the film Dabangg 3

Critical response
The song receives almost good positive response from critics citing it the soothing, soulful and Melody song.

Hindi Tracks also saying the same compliment and gave 3.9 out of 5

Yahoo News praised the song and stated that it may hit the heart

Zee News also praised this song and said It is one of those songs that will ignite a soothing flame in your soul and will make you hit the replay button once it finishes.

Music release 
The audio was released on 13 November 2019 on YouTube.

Music video 
The music video of 1 minute 31 seconds has been launched by T-Series on 19 December 2019.

The song features Sonakshi Sinha and Salman Khan as duo number in the dance of this song.

Other versions 

 Tamil – Orey Sontham- Shreya Ghoshal and Jubin Nautiyal, Lyrics – Pa. Vijay
 Telugu – Gulabi- Shreya Ghoshal and Jubin Nautiyal, Lyrics – Ramajogayya Sastry
 Kannada- Thabbibadane – Shreya Ghoshal and Jubin Nautiyal, Lyrics – Anup Bandari

References 

2019 songs
Hindi film songs
Shreya Ghoshal songs
Jubin Nautiyal songs